Virovitica-Podravina County is a northern Slavonian county in Croatia. Its county seat is in Virovitica and it includes the area around the Drava river, hence the name Podravina. Other notable towns are Slatina and Orahovica.

Administrative division
Virovitica-Podravina County holds the following towns and districts:

Towns

Municipalities

Demographics

As of the 2011 census, the county had 84,836 residents. The population density is 42 people per km².

Ethnic Croats form the majority with 91.8% of the population, followed by Serbs at 6.0%.

References

External links
 

 
Slavonia
Counties of Croatia